Podostyela is a genus of ascidian tunicates in the family Styelidae.

Species within the genus Podostyela include:
 Podostyela grynfeltti Harant & Vernières, 1933

References

Stolidobranchia
Tunicate genera